Blossom Valley Athletic League (BVAL) is a high school athletic conference part of the CIF Central Coast Section of the California Interscholastic Federation.  It comprises 24 high schools generally around San Jose, California.  The schools are separated into three divisions, the Mt. Hamilton, Santa Teresa, and West Valley.  Schools are placed in divisions based on the strength of each specific sports program as reassessed at the end of each season.  The league claims the philosophy of power leagues have made this a model program.

Members
Football divisions for 2020.

Mt. Hamilton Division

 Leland High School
Lincoln High School
Live Oak High School
 Oak Grove High School	 
Overfelt High School
 Piedmont Hills High School
 Santa Teresa High School
Silver Creek High School

Santa Teresa Division
Branham High School
Independence High School
Leigh High School
Mt. Pleasant High School
Pioneer High School
Ann Sobrato High School
Westmont High School
Willow Glen High School

West Valley Division
 Andrew Hill High School
 Del Mar High School
Evergreen Valley High School
Gunderson High School
James Lick High School
Prospect High School
San Jose High School
 Yerba Buena High School

References

CIF Central Coast Section